Kongola is a settlement in Namibia's Caprivi Strip and the district capital of Kongola Constituency in the Zambezi Region. It is situated on the national road B8 (Otavi - Katima Mulilo). Kongola has a petrol station and a wholesaler. Although the village is situated on a national power line, it has not yet been connected to the electricity grid. There is also no access to safe water at Kongola.

References

Populated places in the Zambezi Region